Basshunter, a Swedish singer, record producer and DJ, has released five studio albums, two compilation albums, 29 singles, five promotional singles and seven remixes. The Bassmachine, Basshunter's debut studio album, was released by Alex Music on 25 August 2004. In April 2006, he signed his first contract with Extensive Music and Warner Music Sweden. His single "Boten Anna" charted at number one on the Danish singles chart, where it stayed for fourteen weeks; it was certified triple platinum by IFPI Danmark. "Boten Anna" also reached number one in the Swedish singles chart and was certified platinum by IFPI Sverige. His second studio album LOL, released on 28 August 2006, charted in the top five in Sweden, Denmark and Finland. The album was certified platinum by IFPI Finland and double platinum by IFPI Danmark. In late 2006, Basshunter released his albums The Bassmachine and The Old Shit through his own website. Basshunter's third single "Vi sitter i Ventrilo och spelar DotA" was certified gold by IFPI Danmark. Basshunter collaborated with the duo Patrik & Lillen on his single "Vifta med händerna".

The single "Now You're Gone", which uses the same music as "Boten Anna", was originally recorded by Mental Theo and sung by Sebastian Westwood but in 2007, Basshunter recorded a shorter version of "Now You're Gone" to appeal to international audiences. The song subsequently charted at number one on the British and Irish singles charts, and stayed there for five weeks. It was also certified platinum by the British Phonographic Industry and Recorded Music NZ. The second single released was a cover of the KC and the Sunshine Band song "Please Don't Go". The third single was "All I Ever Wanted", which uses the music from "Vi sitter i Ventrilo och spelar DotA" in the style of "Now You're Gone". It charted at number one in Ireland and at number two in the UK, and was certified gold by the British Phonographic Industry and Recorded Music NZ. Now You're Gone – The Album was released on 14 July 2008 and like the single was certified platinum by the British Phonographic Industry and Recorded Music NZ. The fourth single was "Angel in the Night", which was followed by a cover of Westlife's song "I Miss You". Basshunter's sixth and final single from Now You're Gone – The Album was "Walk on Water", which accompanied a deluxe edition re-release of the album featuring new remixes and the previous four singles from the album.

The single "Every Morning" was released before Basshunter's fifth studio album Bass Generation, which was released on 25 September 2009. The album was certified silver by the British Phonographic Industry. The second single was "I Promised Myself", a cover of a Nick Kamen song. A compilation album titled The Early Bedroom Sessions was released on 3 December 2012; it Includes seven songs from The Old Shit, all ten songs from The Bassmachine, and the tracks "Go Down Now", "Trance Up" and "Wacco Will Kick Your Ass", which had previously appeared on singles, and three unreleased songs. On 13 May 2013 he released his sixth studio album Calling Time. The album charted on the American Dance/Electronic Albums chart at number 25. Five tracks from the album were released as singles: "Saturday" (2010), "Fest i hela huset" (2011), "Northern Light", "Dream on the Dancefloor" (2012), "Crash & Burn" and "Calling Time" (2013). "Saturday" was certified gold by Recorded Music NZ. "Fest i hela huset" charted at number five in Sweden; it was recorded in collaboration with participants from the Swedish Big Brother series.

Albums

Studio albums

Compilation albums

Singles

As lead artist

Promotional singles

Other charted songs

Remixes

Singles

Promotional singles

Writing discography

See also
 List of songs recorded by Basshunter

Notes

References

External links
 

Discographies of Swedish artists
Electronic music discographies
Pop music discographies
Discography